Kush & Orange Juice (stylzed as Kush and OJ) is the eighth mixtape by American rapper Wiz Khalifa. It was released on April 14, 2010, by Taylor Gang Records and Rostrum Records. Kush & Orange Juice gained notoriety after its official release by making it the number-one trending topic on both Google and Twitter. On the same day, a link to the mixtape was posted for download on Wiz’s Twitter. The hashtag #kushandorangejuice became the number-six trending topic on the microblogging service after its release and remained on the top trending items on Twitter for three days.

Title and artwork
In an interview with MTV's Mixtape Daily, Wiz Khalifa stated that Kush and Orange Juice would be the title for this release, because "it's perfect for wake-and-bake".

The mixtape's cover artwork was an homage to David Ruffin's album Gentleman Ruffin (1980). The subject matter mainly consisted of partying, pretty women, sex, and marijuana.

Samples
The eighth track, "The Kid Frankie" samples Loose Ends' "Hangin' on a String", in which Khalifa had previously stated that the song was inspired by the character named Frankie from the film The Business (2005), who listens to Loose Ends, while traveling around Spain and other countries. The tenth track, "Never Been" samples "Schala's Theme" from it soundtrack to the video game Chrono Trigger, from which is a same name as its other soundtrack, composed by Yasunori Mitsuda. The ninth track, "Up" samples Tevin Campbell's "Could It Be". The eleventh track, "In the Cut" samples "Let Go" performed by Frou Frou from the end credits of the film Garden State. The third track, "We're Done" samples "Our Time Is Here" performed by Demi Lovato from its Disney soundtrack, Camp Rock. The twelfth track, "Visions" samples "Huit Octobre 1971" performed by Cortex. The sixth track, "Spotlight" samples "Theme from the Planets" performed by Dexter Wansel, from his album, "Life on Mars" (1976), and the thirteenth track, "Still Blazin" samples Alborosie's song of the same name.

Critical reception
Upon its release, the mixtape received a critical acclaim, with New York Magazine calling the mixtape "a nice showcase of the youngun’s commercial appeal", and that it "makes us think classic G-Funk (specifically, D.J. Quik) and a party mindset". Entertainment Weekly stated that the mixtape was "pretty solid", and "difficult to resist". PopMatters called it "a great listen." Pitchfork Media rated the mixtape 7.2 out of 10, stating "for the most part, Kush and Orange Juice is a surprisingly relaxed and easy listen".

Track listing
life

References

Wiz Khalifa albums
2010 mixtape albums
Albums produced by Big K.R.I.T.
Albums produced by Cardo